Erni Gregorčič  (born 4 June 1976) is the most decorated and successful Slovenian powerlifter and record holder. He is a professional personal trainer and specialized strength coach. He is also the coach of Mariša Golob, the most successful female in Slovenian powerlifting history.

Career 
In 1998 Erni Gregorčič started working in a local gym as a personal trainer and trained on daily basis. During his active years as a personal trainer he discovered powerlifting and was compelled to try it. He started competing in 2010 and since then won more than 30 World and European Championship titles in powerlifting, bench press, push&pull and deadlift.

Throughout his powerlifting career he competed in many different powerlifting federations (GPC, WPC, GPA, WUAP, IPO, WPA) and still holds World and European records in a few of them. He is currently actively participating and competing in WUAP and GPA and is also Slovenian president of this two federations.

Personal records 
Official powerlifting competition records (raw - sleeves):

Official powerlifting competition records (raw - wraps):

Official powerlifting competition records (equipped):

Official bench press competition record (raw):

Official bench press competition record (equipped):

Official push&pull competition records (raw) :

Official deadlift competition record (raw) :

National, European and World records

National records 

Erni is the current Slovenian powerlifting, bench press, push&pull and deadlift record holder in −75 kg weight class in open, submaster and master category.

European records 

Erni holds the current GPA European submaster bench press and push&pull record in −75 kg weight class. He also holds IPO European submaster equipped bench press record in −75 kg weight class.

World records

World and European Championships

References

External links

Erni Gregorčič official website
Erni Gregorčič youtube channel – videos
Erni Gregorčič Allpowerlifting – competition results

Living people
1976 births
Sportspeople from Ljubljana
Slovenian powerlifters
Slovenian sportsmen
Male powerlifters